John Steven Schneider (born April 23, 1962) is an American film, television and multi-media producer and artists' manager based in Los Angeles, California. The Pacifica, California, native made his first forays into show business when he took on the position of personal manager for his younger brother, comedian and actor Rob Schneider, and subsequently managed the San Francisco area rock band Head On. Eventually, John transitioned into producing movies such as The Hot Chick and Deuce Bigalow: Male Gigolo, alongside executive producers Adam Sandler and Jack Giarraputo.

John was the executive producer of Rob, a situation comedy starring Rob Schneider, which aired on the CBS television network in 2012, and co-produced the Academy Award-nominated 2012 feature film Hitchcock. He also serves as the personal manager of comedian, talk-show host and actor Tom Green, and creative consultant for Limp Bizkit frontman Fred Durst. Schneider produced Tom Green Live—the weekly talk show hosted by Green on entrepreneur/media mogul Mark Cuban's AXS TV channel—and is currently engaged in program development for CBS-TV, Showtime and The CW networks in conjunction with The Tannenbaum Company. In addition to his various production and management credits, John previously owned and operated the San Francisco nightclub DNA Lounge, and, at the age of 23, was elected to the Pacifica, California school board. He now resides in the Los Angeles area with his wife and three daughters.

Filmography 
On the Road with Tom Green (TV special) (2015) - executive producer
Tom Green Live (2013) - executive producer
Hitchcock (2012) - co-producer
Rob (TV series) (2012) - executive producer
The Chosen One (2010) - producer
American Virgin (2009) - executive producer
Big Stan (2007) - producer
Deuce Bigalow: European Gigolo (2005) - producer
The Hot Chick (2002) - producer
The Animal (2001) - co-producer

References

External links 

 

1962 births
Film producers from California
American people of Filipino descent
American people of Jewish descent
Place of birth missing (living people)
Living people
People from Pacifica, California